Ben Templeton (born c. 1940) is the co-creator of the classic comic strip Motley's Crew along with his late partner Tom Forman. After the death of his partner, Templeton completed the strip on its own until its cancellation on January 1, 2000. As of 2007, Ben Templeton is semi-retired.

References

1940s births
American cartoonists
Living people